Tenant Mountain is a mountain located in New York Capital Region of New York located northwest of Day Center, New York. Tenant Mountain is the highest point in Saratoga County and it is ranked 13 of 62 on the list of New York County High Points.

References

Mountains of Saratoga County, New York
Mountains of New York (state)